Antillophos bahamensis is a species of sea snail, a marine gastropod mollusc in the family Nassariidae, the true whelks.

Distribution

Description
The maximum recorded shell length is 20 mm.

Habitat
The minimum recorded depth is 400 m. The maximum recorded depth is 400 m.

References

External links

Nassariidae
Gastropods described in 2002